Jose Garrido may refer to:
José Garrido (footballer) (born 1960), Portuguese footballer
José Antonio Garrido (born 1975), Spanish cyclist